From the Devil's Chalise is a 2008 EP by black metal band Behexen. It was released as a three 7" vinyl box-set, including a Behexen logo patch and stickers.

The material was recorded in 2004, but the release was delayed for several reasons for four years.

Track listing

Personnel

Additional personnel
Christophe Szpajdel – logo

External links 
https://web.archive.org/web/20110707160002/http://www.archaic-magazine.com/showband.php?bid=2291
https://web.archive.org/web/20061116141207/http://www.live4metal.com/live-38.htm

2008 EPs
Behexen albums